Beryozovaya Roshcha ("Birch Grove") is a station on the Dzerzhinskaya Line of the Novosibirsk Metro. It opened on June 25, 2005, becoming 12th station in the system. Beryozovaya Roshcha is located in Dzerzhinsky District under crossroad of Koshurnikov Street and Dzerzhinsky Prospekt.

Novosibirsk Metro stations
Railway stations in Russia opened in 2005
Dzerzhinsky City District, Novosibirsk